"Castle of Glass" is a song written by American rock band Linkin Park for their fifth studio album, Living Things. The song was produced by co-lead vocalist Mike Shinoda and Rick Rubin. The song was released as a promotional single for Danger Close Games's 2012 release, Medal of Honor: Warfighter, as with Linkin Park's previous contribution to the Medal of Honor series, "The Catalyst". The single was released on February 2, 2013, in physical format and on March 22, 2013, it was released as a digital single on iTunes.

A Mike Shinoda remix is featured on Linkin Park's second remix album, Recharged. The remix version is also featured in the video game Need for Speed Rivals as part of the soundtrack.

Composition

"Castle of Glass" uses electronic elements from the band's previous studio album, A Thousand Suns. Loudwire noted in their Living Things review that the song features "very different electronic elements and unique sounding samples that the band have added to their musical palette." Yet is one of the most direct that the band has done, with a traditional song structure and a melody reminiscent of country music.

Reception
"Castle of Glass" has received mixed to positive reviews from critics. Billboard wrote in their review of Living Things, "A folk song with LP's muscle, "Castle of Glass" uses compelling songwriting, extended metaphors and a simple but radical (for Linkin Park) arrangement to offer one of the album's most intriguing tracks." A staff reviewer at Sputnikmusic wrote in their mixed review of Living Things that the song sounded too similar to "Powerless" and that the song "would have been better if it wasn’t inferior to the similar sounding final track." AltSounds described "Castle of Glass" in their album review as "a drawn-out filler track that keeps to a crawling pace, is strangely passive and doesn’t leave you feeling very inspired." The song was nominated for the "Best Song in a Game" award at the 2012 Spike Video Game Awards.

Music video
The music video for "Castle of Glass" was recorded on August 1, 2012, and it contains footage from the first-person shooter video game Medal of Honor: Warfighter. It was released on Linkin Park's YouTube channel, linkinparktv, on October 10, 2012. The music video shows a young boy being told that his father has been killed in action. He and his mother mourn the death as the fallen SEALs teammates and their families try to comfort them. The band is shown playing in a storm where shattered pieces of glass circle the band. Towards the end the boy goes through his father's possessions, fast forwarding to him (played by Marine Corps veteran Scott Levy) becoming a SEAL, like his father before him. At the end of the video the man is seen telling a girl the heartbreaking news of her family member, as she too cries. The video hints at the boy and the woman being the family of Rabbit, who died in the previous game and the teammates being Mother and Preacher. True to the Medal of Honor philosophy, "Castle of Glass" highlights the emotional realities soldiers and their families face far from the battlefield.
The video ends with a quote from Winston Churchill, shown in all-caps:

The music video for "Castle of Glass" is also dedicated to the movie The Messenger as Bennington's favorite movie.

The band's part of the music video was filmed entirely in front of a green screen, with the production being handled by Mothership and Digital Domain. Its post-production relied heavily on CGI animation and After-effects. Special effects have a prominent use in this music video, and also continues the motif of a world falling apart, as with the previous Living Things videos. One of these is an opening shot of Mike Shinoda, beginning with a shot under, moving progressively upwards until the walls around him start to crumble. The music video also picks up on suspended animation techniques, which sees objects in a fixed position in air, literally suspended, with a central subject being the one animate in this point of fixed time.

As of February 2023, the music video for "Castle of Glass" has over 550 million views on YouTube.

Live performances
The song made its live debut at the 2012 Spike Video Game Awards on December 7, 2012. Chester, Mike, Brad and Phoenix all sang during the last chorus. On the next day, the song was performed at the 23rd Annual KROQ Almost Acoustic Christmas Festival. Afterwards, the song became a regular spot on tour setlists, and while it has been aborted on a few occasions, it hasn't been dropped consistently from setlists.

Starting from the touring cycle for The Hunting Party in 2014 and continuing into 2017's One More Light World Tour, the band debuted an "Experience Version", which combines the studio version's first verse and chorus with the bridge and ending of the Mike Shinoda remix from Recharged. Throughout the tours, the band also added elements from other songs, such as A Thousand Suns'''s "The Radiance", "It's Goin' Down", etc. During the One More Light World Tour, the Experience Version received a new ending, in which Mike would usually rap with a random verse.

When Mike Shinoda briefly brought Fort Minor back from hiatus in 2015, "Castle of Glass" was placed on the band's setlist, in which he uses a remix of the Recharged remix mashed up with The Rising Tied's "Kenji".

At the Linkin Park and Friends: Celebrate Life in Honor of Chester Bennington tribute concert, the studio version of the song was played for the first time after the Living Things World Tour, with Adrian Young, Tom Dumont and Tony Kanal of No Doubt alongside Alanis Morissette as guests. The song was played one step higher than normal to accommodate Morissette's vocal range.

Mike Shinoda also played "Castle of Glass" consistently during his solo tour in support of Post Traumatic''. The song was performed with him playing piano and was arranged two and a half steps higher.

Personnel 
 Chester Bennington – vocals
 Mike Shinoda – lead vocals, electric guitar, strings, horns, piano
 Brad Delson – acoustic guitar, backing vocals, sampler
 Dave "Phoenix" Farrell – bass guitar, backing vocals
 Rob Bourdon – drums, percussion
 Joe Hahn – synthesizers, sampling, programming

Track listing

Charts

Weekly charts

Year-end charts

Certifications

Release history

References

Linkin Park songs
2013 singles
Song recordings produced by Rick Rubin
Songs written by Mike Shinoda
Warner Records singles
Video game theme songs
Medal of Honor (video game series)
Rock ballads
2012 songs
2012 singles
Electronic rock songs
Folk rock songs